Hippaphesis granicornis is a species of beetle in the family Cerambycidae. It was described by Fairmaire in 1879.

References

Apomecynini
Beetles described in 1879